Jan Andrzej Paweł Kaczmarek (born 29 April 1953) is a Polish composer. He has written scores for more than 70 feature films and documentaries, including Finding Neverland (2004), for which score he won an Oscar and a National Board of Review Award. Other notable scores were for Hachi: A Dog's Tale, Unfaithful, Evening, The Visitor, and Washington Square.

Early life and education
Jan A.P. Kaczmarek was born in 1953 in Konin, Poland. Studying music from an early age, he graduated with a law degree, specializing in legal theory and philosophy of law, from Adam Mickiewicz University in Poznań (1977).

Career
In the late 1970s, Kaczmarek started working with Jerzy Grotowski and his innovative Theater Laboratory. He created the Orchestra of the Eighth Day in 1977. He recorded his first album, Music for the End (1982), for the United States (US) company Flying Fish Records.

In 1989, Kaczmarek moved to Los Angeles, California in the US. In 1992 he won the Drama Desk Award for Outstanding Music in a Play for his incidental music for 'Tis Pity She's a Whore. His music has been released by Sony Classical, Decca, Varèse Sarabande, Verve, Epic, Milan, and Savitor Records. He gives concerts in the United States and Europe.
In 2005, Kaczmarek received the Academy Award for Best Original Score for Finding Neverland, directed by Marc Forster, on which he worked with music editor Christopher Kennedy, among others. Kaczmarek also won the National Board of Review award for Best Score of the Year and was nominated for a Golden Globe and the BAFTA's Anthony Asquith Award for Achievement in Film Music.

In addition to his work in films, Kaczmarek was commissioned to write two symphonic and choral pieces for two important national occasions in Poland: Cantata for Freedom (2005) to celebrate the 25th anniversary of the Solidarity movement, and Oratorio 1956 (2006) to commemorate the 50th anniversary of a bloody uprising against totalitarian government in Poznań, Poland. Both premieres were broadcast live on Polish national television. Other concert works of the composer include Jankiel's Concert, The Open Window and Fanfare A2. On 10 May 2014, the world premiere of Universa – Open Opera, an opera written for the 650th anniversary of the Jagiellonian University, was held in Krakow's Main Square. Jan's last monumental work, Emigra - The Neverending Symphony, was performed in February 2017 in Gdynia, Poland.

Kaczmarek is a member of the American Academy of Motion Picture Arts and Sciences, European Film Academy and Polish Film Academy.

In 2007, Kaczmarek began working to set up a film institute in his home country of Poland. Inspired by the Sundance Institute, he intends for the new institute to serve as a European center for the development of new work in film, theater, music and new media. His Instytut Rozbitek (Rozbitek Institute) opened in 2010.

On 1 July 2015, he was awarded the Knight's Cross of the Order of Polonia Restituta for his outstanding artistic accomplishments and for promoting Polish culture abroad.

Kaczmarek is the founder and director of the Transatlantyk Festival, held yearly in Łódź, Poland.

In 2023, he received the Lifetime Achievement Polish Film Award for his contribution to Polish cinema.

Works

Film

Television

Awards

See also
List of Polish composers
List of Poles
List of Polish Academy Award winners and nominees

References

External links
Jan A.P. Kaczmarek - Official Site

 Jan A.P. Kaczmarek at Culture.pl

1953 births
Living people
People from Konin
Best Original Music Score Academy Award winners
Polish male classical composers
Polish film score composers
Male film score composers
Adam Mickiewicz University in Poznań alumni
Varèse Sarabande Records artists